The Australia–New Zealand bid for the 2023 FIFA Women's World Cup, also known as the AsOne bid, was a successful bid to host the 2023 FIFA Women's World Cup by Football Federation Australia (FFA) and New Zealand Football (NZF). The joint bid was announced on 12 December 2019, combining an already launched effort from Australia that began on 29 October 2018. The bid entails 13 venues in 12 host cities, with a final to be played in Sydney at Stadium Australia.

Background 
After successfully staging the 2015 AFC Asian Cup, speculation that FFA would bid to host a World Cup in Australia intensified. A joint announcement signalling the intent to bid for the 2023 FIFA Women's World Cup was made by the Federal Government and FFA on 13 June 2017.

FFA previously showed interest in bidding for the 2003 FIFA Women's World Cup but ultimately lost despite being one of two "excellent bids" with the FIFA Committee for Women's Football deciding to recommend China. Similar circumstances saw FFA show interest in bidding for the 2011 edition, however then-CEO Ben Buckley submitted a formal letter to FIFA withdrawing from the formal bidding process.

With the release of the Whole of Football Plan in 2014, the FFA referenced bidding for a FIFA Women's World Cup as part of the women's football 10 year strategy. A breakthrough year in 2017 for the Matildas, who claimed the inaugural 2017 Tournament of Nations, increased support for a potential bid. A series of friendly matches against Brazil and China in late 2017 attracted approximately 50,000 fans to see the Matildas, who were subsequently voted by the public as the "Team of the Year" at the AIS Awards.

Bid development

On 13 June 2017, the Australian Government provided $1 million initial funding for a feasibility study of the chances of a bid being successful. Prime Minister Malcolm Turnbull voiced his government's support for the bid, stating that the Matildas "are wonderful role models for young women and girls right across Australia." A further $4 million was provided on 6 February 2018 by the federal government, which FFA CEO David Gallop proclaimed would "bring enormous benefits to the Australian community, not only promoting healthy, active lifestyles but inclusion and gender equality." Premier of NSW Gladys Berejiklian launched plans to attract some of the biggest sporting events in the world to NSW over the next decade, which includes the 2023 FIFA Women's World Cup.

The bid was officially launched on 29 October 2018 with the campaign slogan "#GetOnside". The bid logo and slogan "Limitless" was launched on 7 July 2019. The logo stylizes the blue-green outlines to form Australia with a football.

Addition of New Zealand to bid 

With FIFA's plan to expand the field to 32 teams, a joint Australian–New Zealand bid was announced to be under consideration in July 2019. On 10 December 2019, shortly before the FIFA bid deadline, FFA and NZF announced an agreement to submit a joint bid with 13 stadiums in 12 host cities, the same day launched its bid logo in stylized football with a light blue "AU" curves symbolise Australia and a light green "NZ" also with curves symbolises New Zealand below 2023.

It was reported in 2019 that the countries would theoretically host four groups each (24 games each), and in the later stages, New Zealand would host 5 knockout games and Australia 11 games including the final at Stadium Australia in Sydney following its general renovation.

FIFA football tournament hosting experiences
 
 1993 World Youth Championship
 
 1999 U-17 World Championship
 2008 U-17 Women's World Cup
 2015 U-20 World Cup

In addition, Australia also held the 1956 Olympic football tournament, the 2000 Olympic football tournament and the 2015 AFC Asian Cup

Proposed venues
The following host cities, venues and capacities were included in the Bid Book submitted to FIFA:

Australia

New Zealand

Result
The Australia-New Zealand bid won hosting rights to the 2023 FIFA Women's World Cup on 25 June 2020. In a vote of 35 eligible members of the FIFA Council, the bid received 22 votes to Colombia's 13. FIFA President Gianni Infantino voted for the bid, alongside all council members from the Asian and Oceanian confederations, as well as those from CONCACAF and the Confederation of African Football. Council members from CONMEBOL and UEFA voted for the Colombian bid.

See also 

 2019 FIFA Women's World Cup

References

External links 

2023 FIFA Women's World Cup bids
Bid
Bid